Harry Charles Jagade (December 9, 1926 – November 1968) was an American football fullback in the National Football League for the Cleveland Browns and Chicago Bears.  He also played in the All-America Football Conference for the Baltimore Colts.  Jagade played college football at Indiana University and was drafted in the fourteenth round of the 1948 NFL Draft by the Washington Redskins.

1926 births
1968 deaths
American football running backs
Baltimore Colts (1947–1950) players
Chicago Bears players
Cleveland Browns players
Eastern Conference Pro Bowl players
Indiana Hoosiers football players
Players of American football from Chicago